is an industrial city located in Hyōgo Prefecture, Japan. , the city had an estimated population of 455,555 in 223812 households, and a population density of 9000 persons per km².

Geography
Amagasaki is located in far southeastern Hyōgo Prefecture, next to Osaka. It has the fourth largest population in Hyōgo Prefecture after Kobe, Himeji, and Nishinomiya. Residential areas account for most of the rest of the coastal areas, industrial areas along the Meishin Expressway and JR West Fukuchiyama Line, commercial areas around Hanshin Amagasaki Station and JR JR Amagasaki Station, and its population density is the highest among municipalities in Hyogo Prefecture. Ground subsidence caused by the pumping up of groundwater by factories has reduced one-third of the city's area to sea level, causing flooding damage due to storm surges.

Neighboring municipalities
Hyōgo Prefecture
Itami
Nishinomiya
Osaka Prefecture
Osaka (Nishiyodogawa-ku, Yodogawa-ku)
Toyonaka

Climate
Amagasaki has a Humid subtropical climate (Köppen Cfa) characterized by warm summers and cool winters with light snowfall.  The average annual temperature in Amagasaki is 15.0 °C. The average annual rainfall is 1475 mm with September as the wettest month. The temperatures are highest on average in January, at around 26.9 °C, and lowest in January, at around 3.7 °C.

Demographics
Per Japanese census data, the population of Amagasaki peaked around 1970s has been decreasing steadily since .

History 
The area of Amagasaki was part of ancient Kawabe District of Settsu Province and has been inhabited since ancient times, with the traces of Yayoi period settlementsand many kofun burial mounds found within the city limits. From the Heian period, the area was known for its port of Daimotsuura. During the Edo period, Amagasaki prospered as the castle town of Amagasaki Domain undertake Aoayama and subsequently the Matsudaira clans. The town of Amagasaki was established on April 1, 1889 with the creation of the modern municipalities system. It was elevated to city status on October 1, 1916.

The 1934 Muroto typhoon caused 145 fatalities and much of the city was destroyed by air raids on June 1 and June 15, 1945 during World War II.  The 1995 Great Hanshin earthquake also caused considerable damage and 49 fatalities. Amagasaki was designated a special city on April 1, 2001 with increased local autonomy. A commuter train derailed on the Fukuchiyama Line near Amagasaki on April 25, 2005, resulting in more than 100 dead and 550 injured. On April 1, 2009, Amagasaki was elevated to the status of a core city.

Government
Amagasaki has a mayor-council form of government with a directly elected mayor and a unicameral city council of 42 members. Amagasaki  contributes seven members to the Hyōgo Prefectural Assembly. In terms of national politics, the city is in the Hyōgo 8th district of the lower house of the Diet of Japan.

Politics of Amagasaki 
 2002 Amagasaki mayoral election
On 22 November 2010 Kazumi Inamura became the first popularly elected Greens Japan Mayor as well as the youngest popularly-elected female mayor of the city with 54% of the vote.

Economy 
Amagasaki is a major part of the Hanshin Industrial Region. Businesses headquartered in the city include manufacturers such as Osaka Titanium Technologies. The value of manufactured goods shipments in Amagasaki was 1,288 billion yen in 2004.

Education
Amagasaki has 42 public elementary schools and 17 public middle schools operated by the city government, 11 public high schools operated by the Hyōgo Prefectural Board of Education, and two combined private middle/high schools. In addition, the city also operates one special education school for the handicapped. The College of Industrial Technology, a junior college, and the Sonoda Women's University, a women's four-year college with associated junior college are located in the city

The city has a North Korean school, . It previously had a second school, .

Transportation

Railways 
 JR West - Tōkaidō Main Line (JR Kobe Line) 
  -  
 JR West - Fukuchiyama Line (JR Takarazuka Line)
  -  -  
 JR West - JR Tōzai Line
  -  -  
 Hankyu - Kobe Line
  -    -  
 Hankyu - Itami Line
  
 Hanshin Electric Railway - Hanshin Main Line
  -  -  -  -  - 
 Hanshin Electric Railway - Hanshin Namba Line
  -

Highways 
  Meishin Expressway
 Hanshin Expressway Kobe Route
 Hanshin Expressway Bayshore Route (Port of Osaka-Kobe)

Sister city relations
 Augsburg, Bavaria, Germany - since April 7, 1959
 Anshan, Liaoning, China - since February 2, 1983 (friendship city)
 Kami, Hyogo Prefecture, Japan (Formerly Mikata) - since 1974 (friendship city)

Local attractions
Tano Site, Yayoi period settlement trace, National Historic Site
Amagasaki Castle

Notable people from Amagasaki

 Mitsue Aoki (manga artist)
 Chikamatsu Monzaemon (dramatist of the Edo period)
 Chiyu (bassist of the band Sug)
 Cobra (punk rock band)
 Downtown (comedy duo)
 Hitoshi Matsumoto
 Masatoshi Hamada (Originally from Naniwa-ku, Osaka)
 Gero (singer)
 Heath (bassist of the band X Japan)
 Kunio Hiramatsu (politician)
 Kojin Karatani (philosopher)
 Toshiki Kashu (actor)
 Ryuto Kazuhara (vocalist of boy band Generations from Exile Tribe)
 Keichū (Kokugaku scholar from the Edo period)
 Yoshitada Konoike (politician)
 Maggy (fashion model)
 Ryo Matsuda (actor)
 Shōta Matsushima (actor)
 Kaho Minami (actress)
 Akihiro Murata (shogi player) - Originally from Uozu, Toyama
 Nagisa (comedian of comedy duo Amako Inter)
 Ramo Nakajima (novelist)
 Ai Okawa (fashion model, former idol from Idoling!!!)
 Kazuo Shiraga (modern artist)
 Keiko Tobe (manga artist)
 Rena Uehara (singer) - Born in Amagasaki, based in Osaka
 Yu Yagami (manga artist)
 Seiichi Yamamoto (musician) - Born in Amagasaki, based in Osaka
 Kinuyo Yamashita (video game music composer)
 Shota Yasuda (guitarist of boy band Kanjani Eight)
 Ai Yazawa (manga artist)

Athletes
 Ritsu Doan (football player)
 Yutaka Enatsu (baseball player) - Originally from Nara Prefecture
 Megu Hirose (softball player)
 Daisuke Hosokawa (swimmer)
 Takahiro Ikeyama (baseball player)
 Hideki Irabu (former baseball player) - Originally from Hirara, Okinawa (currently Miyakojima, Okinawa)
 Norihito Kaneto (baseball player)
 Ayumi Karino (softball player)
 Kamui Kobayashi (auto racing driver)
 Naoki Miyanishi (baseball player) - Originally from Nishinomiya, Hyogo
 Minoru Murayama (former baseball player) - Originally from Kita-ku, Kobe
 Takahiko Nomaguchi (baseball player)
 Kengo Nomoto (basketball player)
 Daisuke Oku (football player)
 Hiroaki Saiuchi (baseball player)
 Tochinowaka Michihiro (former sumo wrestler)
 Andy Wu (professional wrestler)

References

External links

 Amagasaki City official website  English machine translation is available on the site.

 
Cities in Hyōgo Prefecture
Port settlements in Japan
Populated coastal places in Japan